Péter Povázsay (born July 27, 1946) is a Hungarian sprint canoer who competed in the early 1970s. He won two medals at the 1975 ICF Canoe Sprint World Championships  in Belgrade with a gold in the C-2 1000 m and a bronze in the C-2 500 m events.

Povázsay also finished fifth in the C-2 1000 m event at the 1972 Summer Olympics in Munich.

References

Sports-reference.com profile

1946 births
Canoeists at the 1972 Summer Olympics
Hungarian male canoeists
Living people
Olympic canoeists of Hungary
ICF Canoe Sprint World Championships medalists in Canadian
20th-century Hungarian people